James Grover Davis was a college football player, an All-Southern center for the 1908 Auburn Tigers.

References

Auburn Tigers football players
All-Southern college football players
American football centers
American football tackles